The following events occurred in August 1926:

Sunday, August 1, 1926

An assassination attempt against Spanish dictator Miguel Primo de Rivera failed in Barcelona when a thrown dagger narrowly missed his head as he rode in a car. A 34-year-old Catalan anarchist was arrested.
Born: Hannah Hauxwell, farmer and television personality, in Baldersdale, England (d. 2018)
Died: Israel Zangwill, 62, British writer

Monday, August 2, 1926
Italy enacted new austerity measures to fight poverty and redress the country's trade deficit. Pastry containing pure white flour was prohibited.
Born: Sy Mah, marathon runner, in Bashaw, Alberta, Canada (d. 1988)

Tuesday, August 3, 1926
Some 400 armed Catholics barricaded themselves in the Church of Our Lady of Guadalupe in Guadalajara, Jalisco, Mexico and exchanged gunfire with federal troops until they ran out of ammunition and surrendered. According to U.S. consular sources, 18 were killed and 40 wounded.
Italy banned any parades, ceremonies and public demonstrations that were not authorized as "effectively useful".
London's first traffic lights came into operation at Piccadilly Circus.
The grand jury in the Aimee Semple McPherson case reconvened to consider further testimony and evidence.
Born: Tony Bennett, singer, in Astoria, Queens, New York (alive in 2021); and Anthony Sampson, writer and journalist, in Billingham, England (d. 2004)

Wednesday, August 4, 1926
Umberto Nobile was feted in Rome for his part in the recent North Pole expedition, as 20,000 filled the square in front of the Palazzo Chigi. Sharing the balcony with Nobile and his team Mussolini declared, "In vain did others try to steal the glory of Major General Nobile and to change the proportion of credit for events without parallel in human history. But I want to say in a voice of thunder that, Italy, it was you who were responsible for the glory, and it was you who pushed and helped him to his objective."
 A policeman in Bahrain shot and killed a superintendent policeman who mistreated him, and managed through the shooting in tearing off a piece of the Political Agent Colonel Daly's ear. Colonel Daly apprehended the shooter and hit him with a bayonet. The incident imposed strict martial law in Bahrain through August and September 1926. A day earlier, the Chief of Bahrain Police, Haji Sulman bin Jassim was shot.

Thursday, August 5, 1926
France and Germany signed a trade accord.
English pilot Alan Cobham arrived in Port Darwin, Australia to complete the first half of his round-trip flight between England and Australia.
The film Don Juan, starring John Barrymore, premieres. It was the first feature-length film to have synchronized sound effects and a musical soundtrack.

Friday, August 6, 1926

Gertrude Ederle became the first woman to successfully swim the English Channel, also setting a new record time of 14 hours, 39 minutes.
Born: Norman Wexler, screenwriter, in New Bedford, Massachusetts (d. 1999)

Saturday, August 7, 1926
Mexican President Plutarco Elías Calles ruled out foreign mediation in the battle between the government and the Catholic church.
Spain and Italy signed a Treaty of Friendship.

Sunday, August 8, 1926
Former French Prime Minister Georges Clemenceau weighed in on the Mellon–Berenger Agreement by publishing an open letter addressed to U.S. President Calvin Coolidge. Excerpts from the letter read, "You are claiming from us payment not of a debt of commerce but of war. You know, as we do, that our treasury is empty ... We are debtors, you are creditors. It seems this is regarded as purely a matter for the cashier's department, but are there no other considerations to be taken into account? ... Come to our villages and read the endless list of their dead and make comparisons, if you will. Was this not a 'bank account?' The loss of this vital force of youth? ... How is it we failed to foresee what is now happening? Why did we not halt under the shells and convoke a board meeting of profiteers to decide the question whether it would allow us to continue in defense of the finest conquest in the finest of histories?"

Monday, August 9, 1926
Agriculturalist Alfred Daniel Hall told the British Association for the Advancement of Science that in the future, humanity would be forced to become vegetarian due to a global wheat famine.

Tuesday, August 10, 1926
In Mexico, 20 people were executed by federal firing squad over the church riots.

Wednesday, August 11, 1926
Yugoslavia, Romania and Greece sent a collective note to Bulgaria demanding that cross-border raids by Macedonian irregulars cease.
In Berlin, 50 were injured in nighttime rioting between communists and republicans on Republic Day (a special day observed during the Weimar Republic commemorating its founding in 1919).
Eastman Kodak said it was working on color motion picture film.
Richard Reese Whittemore, leader of the Whittemore Gang, was hanged.
Born:  Claus von Bülow, Denmark-born British socialite, in Copenhagen (d. 2019); and Aaron Klug, chemist and Nobel Prize laureate, in Želva, Lithuania (d. 2018)

Thursday, August 12, 1926
A munitions factory exploded on Csepel Island in Hungary, killing 24 and injuring 250.
Born: John Derek, actor, director and photographer, in Hollywood, California (d. 1998); Hiroshi Koizumi, Japanese actor, in Kamakura City, Japan (d. 2015); and Wallace Markfield, comic novelist, in Brooklyn, New York (d. 2002)

Friday, August 13, 1926
Lou Gehrig hit two home runs off of fellow baseball legend Walter Johnson in the same game. Jack Fournier in 1914 was the only other player to ever do so.
Born: Fidel Castro, revolutionary and politician, in Birán, Cuba (d. 2016)

Saturday, August 14, 1926
Mexican government agents staged a purge of Chalchihuites, Zacatecas, and arrested Father Luis Bátiz Sainz at a private house.
The comedy film The Boy Friend opened.
Born: René Goscinny, comic book writer and editor, in Paris, France (d. 1977)
Died: John H. Moffitt, 83, American politician

Sunday, August 15, 1926
Film actor Rudolph Valentino fell critically ill, collapsing at the Hotel Ambassador in New York City. He was rushed to hospital and operated on immediately for a ruptured appendix.
Father Luis Bátiz Sainz and three members of the Mexican Association for Catholic Youth were executed by firing squad. The killing caused a band of ranchers led by former colonel Pedro Quintanar to seize the municipal treasury and declare themselves in open rebellion.
Born: Konstantinos Stephanopoulos, politician, in Patras, Greece (d. 2016)

Monday, August 16, 1926
A coffin brought from Norway to London thought to contain the remains of Lord Kitchener was opened by the coroner in the presence of police, but it contained no body. The scenario was the work of a hoaxer going by the name of Frank Power.

Tuesday, August 17, 1926
Judge Charles Merrill Hough of the United States Court of Appeals for the Second Circuit ruled that all visitors to the United States except Canadians required a visa to enter the country.
Born: Jiang Zemin, politician, former General Secretary of the Chinese Communist Party, in Yangzhou, China

Wednesday, August 18, 1926
Mussolini announced the Quota 90, a controversial revaluation of the Italian lira.
British coal miners reopened negotiations with the government to resolve the ongoing lockout.<ref name="chronicle of the 20th c.
Reports circulated that Rudolph Valentino was dead. The New York Polyclinic Hospital issued a bulletin describing his condition as "favorable".

Thursday, August 19, 1926
Rudolph Valentino's condition greatly improved. He answered a list of questions from the media and issued a statement thanking his fans and well-wishers for their messages of encouragement.
Born: Arthur Rock, businessman, in Rochester, New York (alive in 2021)

Friday, August 20, 1926
The Communist Party of Germany excluded Ruth Fischer, Arkadi Maslow, and three other members for asserting that the Soviet Union was no longer a true Communist state.

Saturday, August 21, 1926
Marshal Józef Piłsudski conducted a purge of the Polish military to remove any challenges to his authority.
Rudolph Valentino was stricken with a severe pleuritis relapse.

Died: Ugyen Wangchuck, 64, King of Bhutan

Sunday, August 22, 1926
'Bloody Sunday'; violent clashes took place in Colmar in the Alsace region of France.

Greek dictator Theodoros Pangalos was overthrown in a military coup led by General Georgios Kondylis.
Died: Charles W. Eliot, 92, President of Harvard University

Monday, August 23, 1926

General Kondylis proclaimed himself the new Premier of Greece
Born: Clifford Geertz, anthropologist, in San Francisco, California (d. 2006)
Died: Rudolph Valentino, 31, Italian film actor. His last word before falling into a coma was 'Madre'.

Tuesday, August 24, 1926
100 were injured as a riot nearly ensued in New York when 60,000 mourners, mostly women, pushed through Campbell's Funeral Parlor to get a glimpse of Rudolph Valentino's body lying in state.
27-year-old Rev. Gilbert A. Eakins of Saratoga, Wyoming, was fatally burned when he fell into hot springs at Yellowstone National Park.
Pavlos Kountouriotis was restored as President of Greece.

Wednesday, August 25, 1926
After a second chaotic day of public viewing of Rudolph Valentino's body, it was announced that Campbell's Funeral Parlor was moving the body to a vault until Monday's funeral and that public viewing was closed. Valentino's manager George Ullman explained, "The lack of reverence shown by the crowd, the disorder and attendant rioting since the body was first shown has forced me to this decision."
The film Beau Geste opened.

Thursday, August 26, 1926
Spain demanded that the international district of Tangier be annexed to the Spanish zone of Morocco, which it asserted was necessary to suppress the contraband flow of arms that enabled the recent Rif revolt.
Negotiations between the British government and locked-out coal miners broke down again.

Friday, August 27, 1926
Nazim Bey and three other men were hanged in Ankara for conspiring to assassinate Turkish President Mustafa Kemal Atatürk.
In Wanhsien (now known as the Wanzhou District) in China, troops loyal to the local warlord Wu Peifu under the command of General Yang Sen boarded a British merchant ship of The China Navigation Company, SS Wanhsien, and demanded transportation up the Yangtze River. Tensions had been high over a "wharfage" tax that the local authorities had been imposing on ships using the port. The ship's captain refused to leave port and a deadlock occurred until a boarding party from  investigated and the ship was released after an argument. This was the first in a chain of events culminating in the "Wanhsien Incident" of September 5.
Born: Pat Coombs, actress, in Camberwell, England (d. 2002); Kristen Nygaard, computer scientist and politician, in Oslo, Norway (d. 2002); Jacqueline Grennan Wexler, American Roman Catholic nun and university president (d. 2012)
Died: John Rodgers, 45, American naval officer and aviator

Saturday, August 28, 1926
Dutch Levsen of the Cleveland Indians became the last pitcher in major league baseball history to start and win both games of a doubleheader, defeating the Boston Red Sox 6-1 and 5–1.

Sunday, August 29, 1926
20,000 German monarchists staged an assembly in Nuremberg to hail their "king", Rupprecht of Bavaria. Prince Oskar of Prussia and Field Marshal August von Mackensen also attended the event.
Another incident occurred on the Yangtze River near Wanhsien in which the China Navigation Co. ship Wanliu capsized a sampan in its wake that, according to General Yang Sen, was carrying soldiers under his command. When the ship pulled into Wanhsien, Yang Sen's troops were sent to occupy the ship as he demanded compensation, and once again  had them removed and  Wanliu went on its way.
Born: Betty Lynn, actress, in Kansas City, Missouri (d. 2021)

Monday, August 30, 1926
A funeral Mass for Rudolph Valentino was held at Saint Malachy's Roman Catholic Church in New York. Thousands watched the funeral cortège as it proceeded down Broadway.
The first air "sleeper" flew from Berlin to London. The Hansa-designed biplane had a toilet, wireless phone and berths with beds for four passengers. 
The last voting rights of Italians were removed as the Fascist government abolished the popular election of municipal officers, who were now to be appointed by the state.
Died: Eddie Lyons, 39, American actor

Tuesday, August 31, 1926
An earthquake in Horta, Azores killed 9 and destroyed over 4,000 buildings.
The Soviet and Afghan governments signed a Pact of Neutrality and Non-Aggression to supplement an earlier agreement.
About 300 ship passengers died in Leningrad when the Soviet steamer Burevestnik rammed a pier and sank. 
In Wanhsien, troops of General Yang Sen seized SS Wanhsien for a second time in a week as well as another merchant ship, Wantung. The commander of  did not have enough men to retake both ships this time, so he radioed for help.

References

1926
1926-08
1926-08